Paul Kipkemoi Chelimo (born October 27, 1990) is an Kenyan born American track and field athlete. He is the 2016 Olympic silver medalist and the 2020 Olympic bronze medalist in the 5000 meters.

Career
Born and brought up in Kenya, Chelimo initially went to the US in 2010 to run for Shorter College where he won the 3000 meters and was part of their winning distance medley relay team as Shorter won the 2011 NAIA National Indoor Championship.  Later that year, Shorter won the NAIA Men's Outdoor Track and Field Championship as Chelimo won the 5000 meters and 10000 meters at the championships.  He transferred to the University of North Carolina at Greensboro, taking 2nd place in the 2012 NCAA Championships 5000 meters and repeated the place in 2013.

Chelimo found his path to citizenship by joining the United States Army through the Military accessions vital to national interest (MAVNI) program as a water treatment specialist, then entering their World Class Athletic Program in 2014.

He represented the United States in the 3000 meters at the 2016 IAAF World Indoor Championships held in Portland, Oregon.  He qualified to the World Championships by taking second place at the USA Indoor Track and Field Championships on the same track a week earlier, setting a personal record of 7:39.00.

Later in 2016, he finished third in the 5000 meters at the Olympic Trials. Running aggressively, Chelimo was the first to cover an early breakaway, which was eventually swallowed by another breakaway by previous trials winner Galen Rupp.  Again, Chelimo led the last lap charge to run down Rupp, and after catching him, Chelimo held the lead onto the final straightaway.  Chelimo was eventually run down by the sprint finish of 41-year-old Kenyan American Bernard Lagat, followed closely by Hassan Mead. But Chelimo was able to hold his position to the finish, beating Eric Jenkins to the line by 0.06 of a second and qualifying for the 2016 Summer Olympics.

2016 Olympics
Chelimo ran a personal best 13:19.54 in the prelim of the 5000 metres at the 2016 Summer Olympics.  During the final he stayed near the lead the entire race, withstanding every attack three Ethiopian teammates were trying to throw against eventual winner Mo Farah.  When Farah launched his final kick to win the race, Chelimo was the last to follow Farah, looking, for a few moments at the head of the final stretch, like he would be the only one able to outsprint Farah to the line.  Farah pulled away and Chelimo followed him across the finish line.  On the scoreboard, he was initially announced as the silver medal winner.  Then his name was removed from the results, along with Canadian Mohammed Ahmed and Ethiopian Muktar Edris.   Chelimo had exchanged elbows with both of them during the final turn.  Video showed Chelimo stepping inside of the track.  Hagos Gebrhiwet was elevated to second place, American Bernard Lagat was elevated to third.  The United States appealed and the medal was reinstated, with Edris, the initiator of the contact remaining disqualified. He set a new personal best of 13:03.90 in the race. Chelimo's medal was the first for the US in the event since Bob Schul and Bill Dellinger in the 1964 Summer Olympics, held in Tokyo.

2017 World Championships
Now an American star, he won the National Championships by seven seconds in record time.  At the World Championships, it was a set of familiar faces on the last lap.  This time though, Edris and his teammate Yomif Kejelcha got the jump on Farah and Chelimo going in to the final lap and Chelimo was running virtually even with Farah.  In their pursuit of eventual winner Edris, both had to weave around Kejelcha then sprint for the line.  In his last championship track race, Farah again beat Chelimo across the line, but this time it was much closer, barely a half meter separating the two, Chelimo getting bronze.

2018 USA Indoor Track and Field Championships 
Chelimo participated in the 3000m of the 2018 USA Indoor Track and Field Championships held in Albuquerque, New Mexico. He won the race with a time of 7:57.88, thereby qualifying for the 2018 World Championships.  In the heats of the World Indoor Championships, he was one of many victims of a spate of disqualifications at that meet.  After appeal, he did not get to run in the final.

Major competitions

References

External links

All-Athletics Paul Chelimo biography
U.S. Army profile

Living people
1990 births
People from Elgeyo-Marakwet County
American male long-distance runners
Kenyan male long-distance runners
Athletes (track and field) at the 2016 Summer Olympics
UNC Greensboro Spartans men's track and field athletes
Shorter Hawks men's track and field athletes
Kenyan emigrants to the United States
United States Army soldiers
Medalists at the 2016 Summer Olympics
Olympic silver medalists for the United States in track and field
Universiade medalists in athletics (track and field)
World Athletics Championships medalists
World Athletics Championships athletes for the United States
Olympic male long-distance runners
Universiade silver medalists for Kenya
IAAF Continental Cup winners
USA Indoor Track and Field Championships winners
USA Outdoor Track and Field Championships winners
Medalists at the 2013 Summer Universiade
Athletes (track and field) at the 2020 Summer Olympics
Medalists at the 2020 Summer Olympics
Kalenjin people
Olympic bronze medalists for the United States in track and field
U.S. Army World Class Athlete Program